Travis Egedy (born May 1, 1985), better known by his stage name Pictureplane, is an American electronic musician, visual artist and fashion designer based in Brooklyn, New York. He first appeared in the music scene of Denver, Colorado, making a name for himself at Rhinoceropolis, the DIY space where he also lived. He has been credited for coining the term "witch house". He is also a founder of the fashion brand Alien Body.

Biography
Born in Santa Fe, New Mexico, Travis Egedy grew up a fan of hip hop. In 2001, he started making music, using the Magix Music Maker software. He was a member of the hip hop group Thinking in Circles. He moved to Denver, Colorado to attend the Rocky Mountain College of Art and Design. While at RMCAD, he became interested in noise and experimental music. In 2004, he started using the pseudonym Pictureplane. In 2006, he moved into Rhinoceropolis, the DIY space in Denver.

In 2009, Pictureplane released a studio album, Dark Rift, on Lovepump United Records. In 2011, he released a studio album, Thee Physical, on the label. In that year, he also released Thee Negative Slave Mixtape. In 2012, he moved to Brooklyn, New York.

In 2014, he released The Alien Body Mixtape, which included guest appearances from Sole, Doseone, and Noah23. In 2015, he released a studio album, Technomancer, on Anticon. His 2018 studio album, Degenerate, was released on his own record label Alien Body Music.

In 2020, Pictureplane released the first single, "Avalanche", from his upcoming 2021 album Dopamine. The album is being released through George Clanton's 100% Electronica label.

Discography

Studio albums
 Pictureplane (2004)
 Covered in Blood, Surrounded by Text (2005)
 Slit Red Bird Throat (2007)
 Turquoise Trail (2008)
 Dark Rift (2009)
 Thee Physical (2011)
 Technomancer (2015)
 Sinister Current (2017) 
 Degenerate (2018)
 Dopamine (2021)

Compilation albums
 Rare & Bloody (2013)

Mixtapes
 Thee Negative Slave Mixtape (2011)
 The Alien Body Mixtape (2014)

EPs
 The Shining Path EP (2017) 
 The Degenerate Remixes (2019)

Singles
 "Trance Doll" b/w "New Mind" (2009)
 "True Ruin Light Body" (2010)
 "Real Is a Feeling" (2011)
 "Self Control" (2014)
 "Technomancer" (2015)
 "Hyper Real" b/w "Total Confusion" (2015)
 "Break Trance" b/w "Hot War (Cold Love)" (2016)
 "Standing Outside a Broken Phone Booth with Money in My Hand" (2017) 
 "B.D.S.M" (2018)
 "Sex Trigger (Burn in Heaven)" b/w "Low Key" (2018) 
 "Bio-Hacker" b/w "Fever Dream" (2018) 
 "Shredder" (2019) 
 "Avalanche" (2020)

Guest appearances
 Sole – "Coke Rap" from Nuclear Winter Volume 2: Death Panel (2011)
 Sole and the Skyrider Band – "Bad Captain Swag" from Hello Cruel World (2011)
 Deathface – "Cold Heaven" from Cry for Black Dawn (2014)
 Prayers – "Trust Issues" from Baptism of Thieves (2017)

Productions
 Noah23 – "Goth Star" from Lamp of Invisible Light (2011)
 Antwon – "Living Every Dream" from End of Earth (2012)
 Noah23 – "Tropical Fruit" from Tropical Fruit (2013)
 Antwon – "KLF ELF" from Heavy Hearted in Doldrums (2014)
 Noah23 – "Runnin Thru Yr Head" from Peacock Angel (2015)

Remixes
 Health – "Lost Time (Pictureplane RMX)" from Health//Disco (2008)
 Sole and the Skyrider Band – "Cavalry (Pictureplane Remix)" from Sole and the Skyrider Band Remix LP (2009)
 Future Islands – "Little Dreamer (Pictureplane's Old Dreamer Remix)" from Post Office Wave Chapel (2010)
 Marina and the Diamonds – "Shampain (Pictureplane's Deep Dolphin Remix)" (2010)
 Lockah – "The Sour Drink from the Ocean (Pictureplane Dark Sea Remix)" from When U Stop Feeling Like a Weirdo & Become a Threat (2012)
 Black Marble – "Pretender (Pictureplane's Open the Door Remix)" from Weight Against the Door (2012)

References

External links

 
 
 

Living people
1985 births
Anticon
American electronic musicians
Musicians from Santa Fe, New Mexico
Musicians from Denver
Artists from Denver
Dark wave musicians
Record producers from New Mexico
Record producers from Colorado
American male singers
American fashion designers
21st-century American artists